is a cover album by Japanese singer/songwriter Yōko Oginome. Released through Victor Entertainment on November 25, 2009, to celebrate Oginome's 25th anniversary, the album features covers of popular male-oriented kayōkyoku and J-pop songs.

Track listing 

 Tracks 1, 2, 4, 9, 13, 14, and 15 arranged by Toshiya Shimizu.
 Tracks 3, 5, 6, and 10 arranged by Kaoru Ōhori.
 Tracks 7, 8, 11, and 12 arranged by Yutaka Kaburagi.

References

External links
 
 
 

2009 albums
Yōko Oginome albums
Covers albums
Japanese-language albums
Victor Entertainment albums